Septa may refer to:

Biology
 Septa (gastropod), a gastropod genus in the family Ranellidae
 Septa, the plural of septum, in anatomy, a wall of tissue dividing a cavity (e.g., in the nose)
 Septa, plural for septum (coral), the stony ridges forming part of the corallites of corals

Other uses
 SEPTA, the  Southeastern Pennsylvania Transportation Authority
Septa Unella, a fictional character in A Song of Ice and Fire and its TV adaptation, Game Of Thrones